Saudi Aramco Residential Camp in Dhahran is a residential community built by Saudi Aramco for its employees to live in. It is located within the city of Dhahran (Arabic: الظهران) in Saudi Arabia's Eastern Province. There are three areas recognized by the inhabitants in the Dhahran camp. The first built is known as the Main Camp. It is the oldest part and the busiest as it contains the commissary, various shops and parks, and beautiful infrastructure. The second area, known as the Hills, is the quietest since it is mostly residential and more family friendly. In 2017, a new residential area was opened by Saudi Aramco and named Jebel Heights which is an extension of the entire camp. Jebel Heights consists of two parts. One is known as the "Old Jebels" and the other part is known as the "New Jebels." Houses allocated in the area of Jebel Heights are modern villas that vary from three bedroom houses to five bedroom houses. The Jebel Heights residential area also includes beautiful apartments in the "New Jebels" area.

The Dhahran residential camp is a fenced-in company compound and only Saudi Aramco employees and their dependents may live inside. It is located near the US consulate as well as the Dhahran military airbase, which is located in an area that formerly housed the domestic and international air terminals for the Eastern Province. All commercial air passenger operations have since been moved to King Fahd International Airport in Dammam.

The Dhahran camp (Aramco code: DH) is one of three original expatriate oil company compounds or "districts" in the east of the country, along with the camps in Ras Tanura (refinery and port), and Abqaiq (also Buqayq). Later, other Saudi Aramco compounds were built, such as Udhailiyah, Safaniyah, and Tanajib. More recently, the company established housing areas in various other Saudi cities including Jubail, Yanbu, Jeddah, and Rabigh among others - though not all of these are self-contained company compounds. Dhahran camp was the first company compound, founded in the late 1930s, and is still the largest, with space to accommodate over 11,000 residents. In line with the make up of the overall company workforce, the residents are a mixture of many different nationalities. The town consists of four main divisions: Dhahran "main camp" (the oldest section), Dhahran Hills, Jebel Heights, and the newer Ar-Rabiyah (Executive Housing Area).

Geography
The Dhahran residential camp is a short distance west of downtown Al Khobar, the closest Saudi town to Dhahran, and its traditional shopping center. The camp is about 15 km south of Dammam, both older Saudi port cities on the coast of the Arabian Gulf. Looking farther afield, Dhahran is northeast of Abqaiq, also a Saudi Aramco compound, and southeast of Qatif, and further north, Ras Tanura, Saudi Aramco's main oil port.  The island nation of Bahrain is also within easy driving distance to the east (about 32 km) across a causeway from Al Khobar.

Economy
The economy of the Dhahran Residential Camp is exclusively based on one company, Saudi Aramco, as everyone who lives in the compound is either employed by the company or the dependent of an employee. Dhahran has been Saudi Aramco's worldwide headquarters since its establishment in 1937 and is the center of the company's finance, exploration, engineering, drilling services, medical services, materials supply and other company organizations.

Demographics

Aramco has several self-contained communities to house its employees in the Eastern Province of which Dhahran is the largest with a total population of about 11,000. While in the past, the "senior staff" inhabitants of Dhahran were mainly US employees of Saudi Aramco, this is no longer the case. Due to the ongoing Saudization of the workforce, along with a drive to recruit from less far afield, Western expatriates are now in the minority, both in the company as a whole and in the Dhahran residential community.

 
The community today has shifted somewhat in line with the reduction of western residents into a multi-ethnic mosaic of Saudis, other Arab nationalities (e.g. Lebanese, Egyptian and Jordanian), Asians, various South and North American nationalities and British expats.  After several decades of Saudization by the now 100% Saudi-controlled company, many Saudi families now live on the compound, which culturally and linguistically is still quite westernized (i.e. Islamic customs are followed to a lesser extent there than outside of the compound, and English is the common language of communication and education).

The community is also unusual demographically in that all residents of Dhahran are either employees of Saudi Aramco or their dependents; consequently, several age demographics are under-represented; 15- to 25-year-olds (Saudi Aramco provides no university for employees' dependents so many leave for schools elsewhere) and persons aged 60+ (retirees leave the company).

After 75+ years of community life, Dhahran, and the other three Saudi Aramco compounds have spawned several generations of "Aramcons", most of whom now reside in their country of origin rather than Saudi Arabia. Community ties remain strong years after employees have left however, and "Aramco Reunions" are held by ex-Aramcons in various locations in the US every two years. In addition, the children of Saudi Aramco employees, "Aramco brats", have developed their own cultural identity and hold their own biannual reunions.

Transportation

As the centre of the nation's oil industry, Dhahran enjoys excellent transportation resources both nationally and internationally.

The nation's excellent highway infrastructure was modernized extensively in the '70s and '80s and connects the Dhahran area with all major urban centres in the Kingdom, including its neighbors Kuwait, Qatar, and via a causeway, to the nearby island nation of Bahrain. The oil company also built and maintains Tapline Road for its pipeline stations spread along the highway northwest into Jordan. Roads link Dhahran with Saudi Aramco's other major compounds Ras Tanura and Abqaiq and with its nearest traditional Saudi community Al Khobar.

The King Abdulaziz Air Base, a major Royal Saudi Air Force base lies a short distance south of the compound. The area it occupies used to house one of Saudi Arabia's three major international airports, the Dhahran Airport (DHA). Dhahran airport originally consisted of three sections: the old King Fahd Air Terminal for regular passengers, separate facilities for Aramco corporate use (Aramco formerly had its own passenger airplanes offering international air service for employees until the early '60s), and the Dhahran Airfield, an airfield operated by the U.S. from 1946 until 1962. Today, King Fahd International Airport (DMM) serves the entire metropa olitan area of Dhahran, Dammam, Khobar, Qatif and Al-Thuqbah. DHA also used to contain a section designated to Aramco Aviation Department, from which all company-run flights operated, but Aramco Aviation Department has since moved its services to its own buildings located near the King Fahd International Airport. The American air force still maintains a presence there.

Although rail service in Saudi Arabia plays a much more minor role today than 50 years ago, an industrial railroad with a station adjacent to Dhahran still exists, linking it to the capital Riyadh.

Within the company itself, Saudi Aramco runs free bus service for its employees, both within the compound, between the Dhahran Inter-District Bus Station and each of the three other Aramco districts, and shopping bus service into Khobar. Taxi service is also available within the compound. There are few, if any traffic jams in Dhahran even in rush hours (with the exception of the security gates and around the core area). However, all traffic lights in Dhahran camp are computer-controlled to maximize the traffic flow.

Dhahran's main office buildings, where most of the residents of the Dhahran camp work, include; the Exploration and Petroleum Engineering Center (EXPEC) Building and the Engineering Building, as well as the Tower Building, the Old Administration Building and the New (Executive) Administration Building. The EXPEC, Engineering and Tower buildings are connected by a tunnel to help employees avoid exposure to the extremes of the Saudi climate. These offices are located within the Saudi Aramco camp, but outside the residential camp proper.

Communications

The Communications Department of Saudi Aramco administers land line communications in Dhahran. Local calls (i.e., calls within the Eastern Province) and calls to other Aramco Camps are free. Calls to cities outside the Eastern Province, to mobile phones and overseas calls are charged at the same rates as those set by the Saudi Telecom Company.

A dial-up home internet service is provided for free, however ADSL and Fiber Optic Internet services cost $40 per month. The Communication organisation does not provide mobile communications, these services are provided by national companies such as STC and Mobily.

Education
Within the compound itself, Saudi Aramco operates two schools, the Dhahran Hills School (Elementary, K-4) and the Dhahran School (5-9). The company has never provided a high school level, which used to compel employees to send dependent students out of country after the 9th grade for secondary school and college.  (A graduation ceremony is attached to this rite of passage, and graduating 9th grade Aramco students identify themselves thereafter as the "Class of 2022", for example.) Rumours have aroused that Saudi Aramco is planning to build a High School. Currently however, the International Schools Group (ISG) Dhahran campus, located within a mile of the Saudi Aramco compound in Dhahran, has offered US-based curriculum education through 9th to 12th grade, enabling Dhahran residents to send their children there after leaving the Saudi Aramco school system, if they wish.

Dhahran schools employ an American-based curriculum. The children of Saudi Aramco expatriate employees of whatever nationality are allowed to attend, however the children of Saudi employees may not attend unless they have special permission from the Ministry of Education (very rarely given and only temporarily). Until 1980, Saudi employees living on camp were allowed to register their children in the company school, but thereafter the Saudi Ministry of Education regulations were enforced.

Beyond the compound, the greater Dhahran area is home to the King Fahd University of Petroleum and Minerals (KFUPM), a national technical institution built just outside the compound's original perimeter fence, and the Industrial Training Center (ITC), which includes the campus of the selective College Preparatory Center for promising Saudi secondary students preparing for study abroad.

Media

Newspapers and magazines
All papers published locally are either owned by Saudi Aramco or special community interest groups (SIGs), and they are all free.  The main weekly is the Arabian Sun  newspaper. Most Saudi Aramco-owned papers and magazines are available online at Aramco's official website (anyone may request a hard-copy subscription free of charge). The papers that are owned by SIGs are available online only through Saudi Aramco's internal network.

Like the publications listed above, the company's highly regarded Saudi Aramco World magazine of Middle Eastern and Islamic cultural topics can be subscribed to worldwide for free.

Television
Aramco TV (Dhahran TV, and named Channel 3 later) was the first TV channel in the Arabian Gulf area and the second in the Middle East. Dhahran TV started broadcasting on September 17, 1957. Although originally in English, it later started to broadcast in Arabic, but at the same time, viewers could listen to the English version of the TV programs through Aramco radio simultaneously. By 1970, it had become a commercial free, all-English channel after Al Saudiya started broadcasting in 1966.  Up until the first Gulf War Channel 3 was the only English language television station readily available and it was sometimes the object of humour for its airing of dated and censored entertainment programming, and a bland nightly news broadcast. Programming included on screen calligraphy that announced prayer times and shows that were dated. The channel could not show any kissing between men and women. Most Dhahran residents used their television set to watch VHS tapes or play video games. The main attraction of Channel 3 was that it aired well made documentaries concerning Middle Eastern history, culture, cuisine and environment.

The demise of Channel 3 was due to the fact that Dhahran residents started to get other choices for English language entertainment and news television. In the early 1990s the first Persian Gulf War gave Dhahran residents the ability to pick up the American Forces Network. By the late 1990s, satellite television services were becoming more affordable and offering a wider selection of commercial news and entertainment programming that was less censored and more contemporary. The result was that in 1998, Saudi Aramco discontinued the channel.

Radio
Saudi Aramco operates the radio station 'Studio 1 FM Radio Saudi Aramco' (known locally as simply 'Studio 1 FM'). The station plays an even mix of news and music and is presented in English. Studio 1 FM describes itself as "a service of Saudi Aramco that broadcasts music to the local communities as well as health education, environmental protection and safety messaging." The radio station plays a wide variety of genres including Hot A/C (Pop), 80s, 90s, 2k, and Classic rock. Studio 1 FM is primarily catered towards western expats, and runs programming in a similar style to that of American radio. Regular programming includes 'Todays Hits' with David Wartnaby and 'Good Morning Saudi Arabia' with Scott Boyes. Despite its name, Studio 1 FM can be listened to in the Eastern Province on 94.1 FM, 103.8 FM, and 88.8 FM.

Sport 
The Dhahran community has a very active social calendar undertaken through 'Self-Directed groups' within the Saudi Aramco community. These groups are organized through four main areas; Cultural Groups; Service Groups; Special Interest Groups and Sports Activities, with the latter being the most active, and heavily pursued within Dhahran and the other main areas. A number of the sporting groups have participated internationally, for example Saudi Aramco Youth Soccer Organization (SAYSO) travel teams regularly participate in tournaments in the Middle East and Europe (notably the Gothia Cup, Dana Cup and Norway Cup) and the running group compete in races all over the Middle East. The Little League Baseball team from Dhahran qualified for the Little League World Series in 1983, 1985, 1987–1989, 1991, 1994–1998, and 2000–2011.

Dhahran in film and TV
HOME-The Aramco Brats' Story: a movie that gives a glimpse, for the first time ever, into expatriate life within Dhahran and other Aramco camps in Saudi Arabia through the eyes of its children - the Aramco Brats'.  To be aired on PBS, Discovery Channel, History Channel and Arabian Networks
The West Wing: In one episode, the story plot was picketers outside the Aramco camp of Dhahran.
CNN: A report about the Dhahran compound was aired.
In 1998 after the kidnapping and murder of Matthew Shepard, a Wyoming college student, the major American news networks would occasionally mention that the student's parents lived in Dhahran and worked for Saudi Aramco. In 2002 a made-for-TV movie “The Matthew Shepard Story” was produced by the US-based TV company, NBC.
In 2007 the movie "The Kingdom" was released in theaters in America. The story is about the investigation by the FBI of a bombing of a Western compound in Riyadh, though many have noticed superficial similarities to the ARAMCO compound of Dhahran.
In 2019 the movie "Born a King" was released in theaters in Saudi Arabia, Ithra. The story is about King Faisal (then prince Faisal) who goes to the United Kingdom to persuade them to allow Saudi Arabia to have their own independence

Images

References

External links

Dhahran City
Travel guide with photos
Saudi Aramco World: A 1963 article about Dhahran TV.
History of Dhahran (1950s)
General information about Dhahran, useful for first time visitors -- link broken
Aramco Services Company site: By clicking the "communities" link, information can be found about Dhahran as well as other Aramco communities.
Aramcon Films, Music, Literature and Art
HOME - The Aramco Brats Story a movie that gives a glimpse into extpatriate life in Aramco through the eyes of its children - the Aramco Brats

Dhahran
Saudi Aramco
Gated communities in Saudi Arabia